The Water Polo Pan Pacs is a tournament featuring senior teams from nations along the Pacific Rim. The tournament took its inspiration from the Pan Pacific Swimming Championships as an additional major championship for nations without strong continental championships. This was the first edition of the tournament, held at the Melbourne Sports and Aquatic Centre in Melbourne, Australia from 8–14 January 2012.

The participants were Australia, USA, Canada, China, Japan, Brazil, New Zealand (men only), and an Australian "B" team called the Barbarians.

The Pan Pacs was held in two rounds: A preliminary round where each team played all the other teams once, and a final round where the 1st and 2nd placed teams in the preliminary round play for the gold medal, 3rd and 4th for the bronze medal, and 5th and 6th for 5th place. The men's Barbarians team was not eligible to play in the final round. The women's Barbarbians team could only play in the 5th-place game in the final round.

Points in the preliminary round were earned as follows:
 Win: 3 pts
 Draw: 2 pts
 Loss: 1 pt

Men's tournament
All times are Australian Eastern Daylight Time (UTC+11)

Preliminary round

Final round

5th-place game

Bronze-medal game

Gold-medal game

Final ranking

Women's tournament
All times are Australian Eastern Daylight Time (UTC+11)

Preliminary round

Final round

5th-place game

Bronze-medal game

Gold-medal game

Final ranking

References
Tournament website

Pan Pacific Water Polo Championships
Sports competitions in Melbourne
2012 in water polo
2012 in Australian sport
International water polo competitions hosted by Australia